Steve Barta (born December 25, 1953) is an American Brazilian jazz pianist, author, educator, composer, arranger, producer.

Steve has performed and recorded with Al Jarreau, Hubert Laws, Herbie Mann, Dori Caymmi, B.B. King, Dee Dee Bridgewater, and Paulinho da Costa. He has written several works for symphony orchestra that have been performed worldwide. Barta is a music educator with over thirty years of experience.

References

Brazilian jazz musicians
Brazilian jazz pianists
Post-bop jazz musicians
1953 births
Living people
21st-century pianists